Oasis is a census-designated place in Sierra County, New Mexico, United States. Its population was 149 as of the 2010 census.

Geography

While Interstate 25 passes through the community, it does not have an exit; the community is approximately halfway between exits 59 and 63. New Mexico State Road 187 also passes through the community. Caballo Lake is located to the east of the community.

Demographics

Education
Truth or Consequences Municipal Schools is the school district for the entire county. Truth or Consequences Middle School and Hot Springs High School, both in Truth or Consequences, are the district's secondary schools.

References

Census-designated places in New Mexico
Census-designated places in Sierra County, New Mexico